Belinda Montgomery (born July 23, 1950) is a Canadian-American actress. She initially attracted notice for playing Cinderella in the 1969 television film Hey, Cinderella!. She appeared in films include The Todd Killings (1971), The Other Side of the Mountain (1975) and its sequel The Other Side of the Mountain Part 2 (1978), Stone Cold Dead (1979), and Silent Madness (1984).  She starred as Dr. Elizabeth Merrill in the science-fiction series Man from Atlantis (1977-78), and as Katherine Howser, Doogie's mother, in the medical comedy-drama series, Doogie Howser, M.D. (1989-1993).

Life and career
Montgomery was born in Winnipeg, Manitoba. She is the daughter of actor Cecil Montgomery. Her siblings are actor Lee Harcourt Montgomery and actress Tannis G. Montgomery. She began acting in teen roles, include 1967 family series Barney Boomer, and 1969 television special Hey, Cinderella! playing the role of Cinderella.

During 1970s, Montgomery played many leading roles on the made-for-television movies, including D.A.: Conspiracy to Kill (1971), Lock, Stock and Barrel (1971), The Bravos (1972), Women in Chains (1972), and The Devil's Daughter (1973). She made her big screen debut in the 1971 thriller film The Todd Killings opposite Robert F. Lyons. She later starred in the romantic drama film The Other Side of the Mountain (1975) and its sequel The Other Side of the Mountain Part 2 (1978), and the crime dramas Breaking Point (1976) and Stone Cold Dead (1979). In 1984, she starred in the slasher film Silent Madness.

Montgomery starred alongside Patrick Duffy in the short-lived NBC science fiction series Man from Atlantis from 1977 to 1978. In 1988, she starred in the another short-lived NBC series, Aaron's Way. From 1989 to 1993, she starred as Katherine Howser, Doogie's mother, in the ABC medical comedy-drama series, Doogie Howser, M.D.. Montgomery also had a recurring role on the Miami Vice, and has made over 80 guest appearances on television, including appearances on Ironside, T. J. Hooker, Dynasty, The Love Boat, Murder, She Wrote, L.A. Law, JAG, Mannix, Magnum, P.I., The Sixth Sense, The Virginian and Ghost Whisperer, among other series. Her recent credits include 2010 action film Tron: Legacy and 2017 Lifetime Christmas romantic comedy Snowed-Inn Christmas.

In March 2013, writing under the pen name B. Montgomery, Belinda submitted a short story "St. Patrick of the Pineapple" to Midlife Collage, an online writing contest. Montgomery's story won first place in the contest.

Filmography

 1967 Barney Boomer as Susan
 1969 CBS Playhouse as Eula
 1969 The Virginian as Peg Halstead
 1970 Hey, Cinderella! as Cinderella
 1970 Ritual of Evil as Loey Wiley
 1970 Paris 7000
 1970 Ironside as Marla Cardwell
 1970 Matt Lincoln as Nina
 1971 D.A.: Conspiracy To Kill as Luanne Gibson
 1971 Alias Smith and Jones as Penny Roach
 1971 Lock, Stock and Barrel as Roselle Bridgeman
 1971 The Todd Killings as Roberta
 1971 Owen Marshall: Counselor at Law
 1972 The Bravos as Heller Chase
 1972 The Sixth Sense as Tina Norris
 1972 Women in Chains as Melinda Carr
 1971-1972 The F.B.I. as Margo Bengston
 1972 Assignment Vienna as Julie Hayes
 1972 Cannon as Anne
 1972 Mannix as Susan Graham
 1972 The Rookies as Laurie
 1973 The Devil's Daughter as Diane Shaw
 1973 Crime Club as Anne Dryden
 1973 Barnaby Jones as Amy Partridge
 1973 Letters from Three Lovers as Angela "Angie" Mason
 1974 The New Land as Danika (episode "The Word is: Alternative")
 1974 Petrocelli as Barbara
 1969-1975 Marcus Welby, M.D. as Mary Ann Graham
 1973-1975 The Streets of San Francisco Karen Pearson / Susan Howard
 1975 The Other Side of the Mountain as Audra Jo Nicholson
 1969-1975 Medical Center Currie, Joyce / Janet / Melanie Toland / Eunice
 1976 City of Angels
 1976 Breaking Point as Diana McBain
 1976 Insight as Roseanne
 1976 Gibbsville
 1977 Westside Medical
 1977 Nashville 99 as Summer
 1977 Kingston: Confidential
 1977 Most Wanted
 1977 The Hostage Heart as Fiona
 1977 Quincy, M.E. as Bonnie DeMarco
 1978 The Other Side of the Mountain Part 2 as Audra Jo Nicholson
 1978 Lou Grant as Carol
 1977-1978 Man from Atlantis as Dr. Elizabeth Merrill (series co-star)
 1978 Blackout as Annie Gallo
 1978 Sword of Justice as Julie Lang
 1979 Murder In Music City as Peggy Ann West
 1979 How the West Was Won as Florrie
 1979 Stone Cold Dead as Sandy MacAuley
 1979 Marciano as Barbara Marciano
 1979 Eischied
 1980 Fantasy Island
 1980 Turnover Smith as Kelly
 1980 Trouble In High Timber County as Carrie Yeager
 1980 Trapper John, M.D. as Darby
 1981 Concrete Cowboys as Janine
 1981 The Misadventures of Sheriff Lobo
 1982 Dynasty as Jennifer
 1982 CHiPs as Elaine Price
 1982 Bare Essence as Melody
 1981-1982 The Love Boat as Karen Singer / Valerie Singer
 1983 Uncommon Valor as Joan
 1983 Tell Me That You Love Me as Lenora
 1983 Whiz Kids as Judy Hubbard
 1984 Blue Thunder as Dr. Nell Lindsay
 1984 Lottery!
 1984 Magnum, P.I. as Fran "Frannie" Huddle
 1984 Silent Madness as Dr. Joan Gilmore
 1984 T. J. Hooker as Dr. Sandy Roberts / Laura Dietrich
 1985 Murder, She Wrote as Pamela Crane
 1985 Riptide as Rainey
 1985 Street Hawk as Stefanie Craig
 1985 The Hitchhiker as Carla Magnuson
 1985 Finder of Lost Loves as Lisa Hennessey
 1985-1986 Crazy Like a Fox as Kelly Aspen
 1986 Dalton: Code of Vengeance II as Libby
 1986 Stark: Mirror Image as Claire Graves
 1982-1986 Simon & Simon as Laura Steubens Dennison / Sherry Dayton / Joyce Dolan / Dorrie Wilson
 1986 Adam: His Song Continues as Myra Schimdbauer
 1986-1987 Days of Our Lives as Sylvie Gallagher
 1987 Danger Bay as Dr. Pam Summer
 1987 Stone Fox as Doc Smith
 1988 Aaron's Way as Sarah Miller
 1984-1989 Miami Vice as Caroline Crockett / Caroline Ballard
 1989 In the Heat of the Night as Nora Womack
 1990 Casey's Gift: For Love of A Child as Terry Ctilwell
 1989-1993 Doogie Howser, M.D. as Katharine Howser
 1993 L.A. Law as Jessica Wilton
 1995 Burke's Law as Kelly Peterson
 1996 Life Happens as Molly Stewart
 1996 Promised Land as Lisa Smith
 1996 Mr. & Mrs. Smith as Amy Pitzer
 1997 Beyond Belief: Fact or Fiction as Alison Fender
 1998 Dirty Little Secret as Gina
 1998 Phantom Town as Mom
 1999 Hope Island as Jo Summers
 2000 The Scarecrow as Polly
 2001 Camouflage as Diane
 2002 JAG as Captain Fryer, Harm's Aviation Expert
 2005 Ghost Whisperer as Ursula Hilliard
 2010 Tron: Legacy as Grandma Flynn
 2017 Snowed-Inn Christmas as Carol Winters

References

External links
 
 
 

Living people
20th-century American actresses
21st-century American actresses
20th-century Canadian actresses
21st-century Canadian actresses
Actresses from Winnipeg
Artists from Winnipeg
American film actresses
American television actresses
Canadian emigrants to the United States
Canadian film actresses
Canadian television actresses
Canadian watercolourists
Year of birth missing (living people)